"Are You with Me" is the second single by the Potbelleez from the self-titled debut album The Potbelleez.

Track listing
Australian CD single
 Are You with Me (Radio Mix)
 Are You with Me (Original Mix)
 Are You with Me (Hook N Sling Mix)
 Are You with Me (Original Acid Mix)
 Are You with Me (Mind Electric Mix)

Chart performance
"Are You with Me" was a Gold-selling single in Australia and has yet to be released outside of Australia and New Zealand.

Charts

Weekly charts

(A) means that the Original Mix/Hook N Sling Mix/Original Acid Mix/Mind Electric Mix/mrTimothy Mix charted.

Year-end charts

Release history

References

2008 singles
2008 songs
Songs written by Ilan Kidron